Jean Lacoste (born 1950 in Paris) is a French-German philosopher, scholar and essayist. He is known for his research on Nietzsche, Goethe, Walter Benjamin and Ernst Cassirer. He is currently a philosophy professor at the Ecole Normale Supérieure.

Publications
 La Philosophie aujourd'hui
 La philosophie de l'art
 Goethe
 Les chemins du labyrinthe
 Qu'est-Ce Que Le Beau
 Goethe, science et philosophie
 Le "Voyage en Italie" de Goethe
 La philosophie au XXème siècle. Introduction à la pensée. philosophique. contemporaine. Essai et textes, Paris, Hatier, 1988

References

External links
 Jean Lacoste’s Philosophy of Art comes in Persian

1950 births
Living people
French philosophers
Nietzsche scholars
Philosophers of art
Academic staff of the École Normale Supérieure
École Normale Supérieure alumni